Frederik Nielsen and Ken Skupski were the defending champions but Nielsen decided not to participate.
Skupski plays alongside Jamie Delgado. They went on to win the title against Martin Fischer and Philipp Oswald 7–5, 7–5 in the final.

Seeds

Draw

Draw

References
 Main Draw

Internazionali Trofeo Lame Perrel-Faip - Doubles
2012 Doubles